Dr. Manmohan Singh (born 26 September 1932) is an Indian politician, economist, academician and bureaucrat who served as the 13th Prime Minister of India from 2004 to 2014. He is the third longest-serving prime minister after Jawaharlal Nehru and Indira Gandhi. A member of the Indian National Congress, Singh was the first Sikh prime minister of India. He was also the first prime minister since Jawaharlal Nehru to be re-elected after completing a full five-year term.

Born in Gah, West Punjab, in what is today Pakistan, Singh's family migrated to India during its partition in 1947. After obtaining his doctorate in economics from Oxford, Singh worked for the United Nations during 1966–1969. He subsequently began his bureaucratic career when Lalit Narayan Mishra hired him as an advisor in the Ministry of Commerce and Industry. During the 1970s and 1980s, Singh held several key posts in the Government of India, such as Chief Economic Advisor (1972–1976), governor of the Reserve Bank (1982–1985) and head of the Planning Commission (1985–1987).

In 1991, as India faced a severe economic crisis, the newly elected prime minister, P. V. Narasimha Rao, surprisingly inducted the apolitical Singh into his cabinet as finance minister. Over the next few years, despite strong opposition, he carried out several structural reforms that liberalised India's economy. Although these measures proved successful in averting the crisis, and enhanced Singh's reputation globally as a leading reform-minded economist, the incumbent Congress Party fared poorly in the 1996 general election. Subsequently, Singh was leader of the opposition in the Rajya Sabha (the upper house of the Parliament of India) during the Atal Bihari Vajpayee government of 1998–2004.

In 2004, when the Congress-led United Progressive Alliance (UPA) came to power, its chairperson Sonia Gandhi unexpectedly relinquished the prime ministership to Singh. His first ministry executed several key legislations and projects, including the National Rural Health Mission, Unique Identification Authority, Rural Employment Guarantee scheme and Right to Information Act. In 2008, opposition to a historic civil nuclear agreement with the United States nearly caused Singh's government to fall after Left Front parties withdrew their support. Although India's economy grew rapidly under UPA, its security was threatened by several terrorist incidents (including the 2008 Mumbai attacks) and the continuing Maoist insurgency.

The 2009 general election saw the UPA return with an increased mandate, with Singh retaining the office of Prime Minister. Over the next few years, Singh's second ministry government faced a number of corruption charges over the organisation of the 2010 Commonwealth Games, the 2G spectrum allocation case and the allocation of coal blocks. After his term ended in 2014 he opted out from the race for the office of the Prime Minister of India during the 2014 Indian general election. Singh was never a member of the Lok Sabha but has served as a member of the Rajya Sabha, representing the state of Assam from 1991 to 2019 and Rajasthan since 2019.

Early life and education 
Singh was born to Gurmukh Singh and Amrit Kaur on 26 September 1932, in Gah, Punjab, British India, into a Sikh family. He lost his mother when he was very young and was raised by his paternal grandmother, to whom he was very close. His early schooling was in the Urdu medium, and even as Prime Minister years later, he wrote his apparently Hindi speeches in the Urdu script, although sometimes he would also use Gurmukhi, a script used to write Punjabi, his mother tongue.

After the Partition of India, his family migrated to Amritsar, India, where he studied at Hindu College, Amritsar. He attended Panjab University, then in Hoshiarpur, Punjab, studying Economics and got his bachelor's and master's degrees in 1952 and 1954, respectively, standing first throughout his academic career. He completed his Economics Tripos at University of Cambridge in 1957. He was a member of St John's College.

In a 2005 interview with the British journalist Mark Tully, Singh said about his Cambridge days:

After Cambridge, Singh returned to India and served as a teacher at Panjab University. In 1960, he went to the University of Oxford for his DPhil, where he was a member of Nuffield College. His 1962 doctoral thesis under the supervision of I.M.D. Little was titled "India's export performance, 1951–1960, export prospects and policy implications", and was later the basis for his book "India's Export Trends and Prospects for Self-Sustained Growth".

Early career 
After completing his D.Phil., Singh returned to India. He was a senior lecturer of economics at Panjab University from 1957 to 1959. During 1959 and 1963, he served as a reader in economics at Panjab University, and from 1963 to 1965, he was an economics professor there. Then he went to work for the United Nations Conference on Trade and Development (UNCTAD) from 1966 to 1969. Later, he was appointed as an advisor to the Ministry of Foreign Trade by Lalit Narayan Mishra, in recognition of Singh's talent as an economist.

From 1969 to 1971, Singh was a professor of international trade at the Delhi School of Economics, University of Delhi.

In 1972, Singh was chief economic adviser in the Ministry of Finance, and in 1976 he was secretary in the Finance Ministry. In 1980–1982 he was at the Planning Commission, and in 1982, he was appointed governor of the Reserve Bank of India under then finance minister Pranab Mukherjee and held the post until 1985. He went on to become the deputy chairman of the Planning Commission (India) from 1985 to 1987. Following his tenure at the Planning Commission, he was secretary general of the South Commission, an independent economic policy think tank headquartered in Geneva, Switzerland from 1987 to November 1990.

Singh returned to India from Geneva in November 1990 and held the post as the advisor to Prime Minister of India on economic affairs during the tenure of Chandra Shekar. In March 1991, he became chairman of the University Grants Commission.

Family and personal life 

Singh married Gursharan Kaur in 1958. They have three daughters, Upinder Singh, Daman Singh and Amrit Singh. Upinder Singh is a professor of history at Ashoka University. She has written six books, including Ancient Delhi (1999) and A History of Ancient and Early Medieval India (2008). Daman Singh is a graduate of St. Stephen's College, Delhi and Institute of Rural Management, Anand, Gujarat, and author of The Last Frontier: People and Forests in Mizoram and a novel Nine by Nine, Amrit Singh is a staff attorney at the American Civil Liberties Union. Ashok Pattnaik, 1983 batch Indian Police Service officer, son-in-law of former Prime Minister Manmohan Singh, was appointed CEO of National Intelligence Grid (NATGRID) in 2016.

Singh has undergone multiple cardiac bypass surgeries, the most recent of which took place in January 2009.

Political career 
In June 1991, India's prime minister at the time, P. V. Narasimha Rao, chose Singh to be his finance minister. Singh told Mark Tully the British journalist in 2005 "On the day (Rao) was formulating his cabinet, he sent his Principal Secretary to me saying, 'The PM would like you to become the Minister of Finance'. I didn't take it seriously. He eventually tracked me down the next morning, rather angry, and demanded that I get dressed up and come to Rashtrapati Bhavan for the swearing in. So that's how I started in politics".

Minister of Finance 
 
In 1991, India's fiscal deficit was close to 8.5 per cent of the gross domestic product, the balance of payments deficit was huge and the current account deficit was close to 3.5 percent of India's GDP. India's foreign reserves barely amounted to US$1 billion, enough to pay for 2 weeks of imports, in comparison to US$600 billion today.

Evidently, India was facing an economic crisis. At this point, the government of India sought funds from the supranational International Monetary Fund, which, while assisting India financially, imposed several conditions regarding India's economic policy. In effect, IMF-dictated policy meant that the ubiquitous Licence Raj had to be dismantled, and India's attempt at a state-controlled economy had to end.

Singh explained to the PM and the party that India is facing an unprecedented crisis. However the rank and file of the party resisted deregulation. So Chidambaram and Singh explained to the party that the economy would collapse if it was not deregulated. To the dismay of the party, Rao allowed Singh to deregulate the Indian economy.

Subsequently, Singh, who had thus far been one of the most influential architects of India's socialist economy, eliminated the permit raj, reduced state control of the economy, and reduced import taxes

Rao and Singh thus implemented policies to open up the economy and change India's socialist economy to a more capitalistic one, in the process dismantling the Licence Raj, a system that inhibited the prosperity of private businesses. They removed many obstacles standing in the way of Foreign Direct Investment (FDI), and initiated the process of the privatisation of public sector companies. However, in spite of these reforms, Rao's government was voted out in 1996 due to non-performance of government in other areas. In praise of Singh's work that pushed India towards a market economy, long-time Cabinet minister P. Chidambaram has compared Singh's role in India's reforms to Deng Xiaoping's in China.

In 1993, Singh offered his resignation from the post of Finance Minister after a parliamentary investigation report criticised his ministry for not being able to anticipate a US$1.8 billion securities scandal. Prime Minister Rao refused Singh's resignation, instead promising to punish the individuals directly accused in the report.

Leader of Opposition in Rajya Sabha 
Singh was first elected to the upper house of Parliament, the Rajya Sabha, in 1991 by the legislature of the state of Assam, and was re-elected in 1995, 2001, 2007 and 2013. From 1998 to 2004, while the Bharatiya Janata Party was in power, Singh was the Leader of the Opposition in the Rajya Sabha. In 1999, he contested for the Lok Sabha from South Delhi but was unable to win the seat.

Prime Minister

First term: 2004–2009 

After the 2004 general elections, the Indian National Congress ended the incumbent National Democratic Alliance (NDA) tenure by becoming the political party with the single largest number of seats in the Lok Sabha. It formed United Progressive Alliance (UPA) with allies and staked claim to form government. In a surprise move, Chairperson Sonia Gandhi declared Manmohan Singh, a technocrat, as the UPA candidate for the Prime Ministership. Despite the fact that Singh had never won a Lok Sabha seat, according to the BBC, he "enjoyed massive popular support, not least because he was seen by many as a clean politician untouched by the taint of corruption that has run through many Indian administrations." He took the oath as the Prime Minister of India on 22 May 2004.

Economic policy 
In 1991, Singh, as Finance Minister, abolished the Licence Raj, source of slow economic growth and corruption in the Indian economy for decades. He liberalised the Indian economy, allowing it to speed up development dramatically. During his term as Prime Minister, Singh continued to encourage growth in the Indian market, enjoying widespread success in these matters. Singh, along with his Finance Minister, P. Chidambaram, presided over a period where the Indian economy grew with an 8–9% economic growth rate. In 2007, India achieved its highest GDP growth rate of 9% and became the second fastest growing major economy in the world. Singh's ministry enacted a National Employment Guarantee Act (MGNREGA) in 2005.

Singh's government continued the Golden Quadrilateral and the highway modernisation program that was initiated by Vajpayee's government. Singh also worked on reforming the banking and financial sectors, as well as public sector companies. The Finance ministry worked towards relieving farmers of their debt and worked towards pro-industry policies. In 2005, Singh's government introduced the value added tax, replacing sales tax. In 2007 and early 2008, the global problem of inflation impacted India.

Healthcare and education 
In 2005, Prime Minister Singh and his government's health ministry started the National Rural Health Mission (NHRM), which mobilised half a million community health workers. This rural health initiative was praised by the American economist Jeffrey Sachs. In 2006, his Government implemented the proposal to reserve 27% of seats in All India Institute of Medical Studies (AIIMS), Indian Institutes of Technology (IITs), the Indian Institutes of Management (IIMs) and other central institutions of higher education for Other Backward Classes which led to 2006 Indian anti-reservation protests.

On 2 July 2009, Singh ministry introduced The Right to Education Act (RTE) act. Eight IIT's were opened in the states of Andhra Pradesh, Bihar, Gujarat, Orissa, Punjab, Madhya Pradesh, Rajasthan and Himachal Pradesh. The Singh government also continued the Sarva Shiksha Abhiyan programme. The programme includes the introduction and improvement of mid-day meals and the opening of schools all over India, especially in rural areas, to fight illiteracy.

Security and Home Affairs 

Singh's government strengthened anti-terror laws with amendments to Unlawful Activities (Prevention) Act (UAPA). National Investigation Agency (NIA) was also created soon after the Nov 2008 Mumbai terror attacks, as need for a central agency to combat terrorism was realised. Also, Unique Identification Authority of India was established in February 2009, an agency responsible for implementing the envisioned Multipurpose National Identity Card with the objective of increasing national security and facilitating e-governance.

Singh's administration initiated a massive reconstruction effort in Kashmir to stabilise the region but after some period of success, insurgent infiltration and terrorism in Kashmir has increased since 2009. However, the Singh administration was successful in reducing terrorism in Northeast India.

Notable legislation 
The important National Rural Employment Guarantee Act (NREGA) and the Right to Information Act were passed by the Parliament in 2005 during his tenure. While the effectiveness of the NREGA has been successful at various degrees, in various regions, the RTI act has proved crucial in India's fight against corruption. New cash benefits were also introduced for widows, pregnant women, and landless persons.

The Right to Fair Compensation and Transparency in Land Acquisition, Rehabilitation and Resettlement Act, 2013 was passed on 29 August 2013 in the Lok Sabha (lower house of the Indian parliament) and on 4 September 2013 in Rajya Sabha (upper house of the Indian parliament). The bill received the assent of the President of India, Pranab Mukherjee on 27 September 2013. The Act came into force from 1 January 2014.

Right of Children to Free and Compulsory Education Act was enacted on 4 August 2009, which describes the modalities of the importance of free and compulsory education for children between 6 and 14 in India under Article 21A of the Indian Constitution. India became one of 135 countries to make education a fundamental right of every child when the act came into force on 1 April 2010.

Foreign policy 

Manmohan Singh continued the pragmatic foreign policy that was started by P.V. Narasimha Rao and continued by Bharatiya Janata Party's Atal Bihari Vajpayee. Singh continued the peace process with Pakistan initiated by his predecessor, Atal Bihari Vajpayee. Exchange of high-level visits by top leaders from both countries have highlighted his tenure. Efforts have been made during Singh's tenure to end the border dispute with People's Republic of China. In November 2006, Chinese President Hu Jintao visited India which was followed by Singh's visit to Beijing in January 2008. A major development in Sino-Indian relations was the reopening of the Nathula Pass in 2006 after being closed for more than four decades. Premier of the State Council of the People's Republic of China, Li Keqiang paid a state visit to India (Delhi-Mumbai) from 19 to 21 May 2013. Singh paid an official visit to China from 22 to 24 October 2013. Signed were three agreements establishing sister-city partnership between Delhi-Beijing, Kolkata-Kunming and Bangalore-Chengdu. As of 2010, the People's Republic of China is the second biggest trade partner of India.

Relations with Afghanistan have improved considerably, with India now becoming the largest regional donor to Afghanistan. During Afghan President Hamid Karzai's visit to New Delhi in August 2008, Manmohan Singh increased the aid package to Afghanistan for the development of more schools, health clinics, infrastructure, and defence. Under the leadership of Singh, India emerged as one of the single largest aid donors to Afghanistan.

Singh's government worked towards stronger ties with the United States. He visited the United States in July 2005 initiating negotiations over the Indo-US civilian nuclear agreement. This was followed by George W. Bush's successful visit to India in March 2006, during which the declaration over the nuclear agreement was made, giving India access to American nuclear fuel and technology while India will have to allow IAEA inspection of its civil nuclear reactors. After more than two years for more negotiations, followed by approval from the IAEA, Nuclear Suppliers Group and the US Congress, India and the US signed the agreement on 10 October 2008 with Pranab Mukherjee representing India. Singh had the first official state visit to the White House during the administration of US President Barack Obama. The visit took place in November 2009, and several discussions took place, including on trade and nuclear power.

Relations have improved with Japan and European Union countries, like the United Kingdom, France, and Germany. Relations with Iran have continued and negotiations over the Iran-Pakistan-India gas pipeline have taken place. New Delhi hosted an India–Africa Summit in April 2006 which was attended by the leaders of 15 African states. Relations have improved with other developing countries, particularly Brazil and South Africa. Singh carried forward the momentum which was established after the "Brasilia Declaration" in 2003 and the IBSA Dialogue Forum was formed.

Singh's government has also been especially keen on expanding ties with Israel. Since 2003, the two countries have made significant investments in each other and Israel now rivals Russia to become India's defence partner. Though there have been a few diplomatic glitches between India and Russia, especially over the delay and price hike of several Russian weapons to be delivered to India, relations between the two remain strong with India and Russia signing various agreements to increase defence, nuclear energy and space co-operation.

Second term: 2009–2014 
India held general elections to the 15th Lok Sabha in five phases between 16 April 2009 and 13 May 2009. The results of the election were announced on 16 May 2009.
Strong showing in Andhra Pradesh, Rajasthan, Maharashtra, Tamil Nadu, Kerala, West Bengal and Uttar Pradesh helped the United Progressive Alliance (UPA) form the new government under the incumbent Singh, who became the first prime minister since Jawaharlal Nehru in 1962 to win re-election after completing a full five-year term. The Congress and its allies were able to put together a comfortable majority with support from 322 members out of 543 members of the House. These included those of the UPA and the external support from the Bahujan Samaj Party (BSP), Samajwadi Party (SP), Janata Dal (Secular) (JD(S)), Rashtriya Janata Dal (RJD) and other minor parties.

On 22 May 2009, Manmohan Singh was sworn in as the Prime Minister during a ceremony held at Rashtrapati Bhavan. The 2009 Indian general election was the largest democratic election in the world held prior to 2014 (834 million) and 2019 (912 million), with an eligible electorate of 714 million.

The 2012 report filed by the CAG in Parliament of India states that due to the allocation of coal blocks to certain private companies without bidding process the nation suffered an estimated loss of Rs 1.85 trillion (short scale) between 2005 and 2009 in which Manmohan Singh was the coal minister of India.

Manmohan Singh declined to appear before a Joint Parliamentary Committee (JPC) in April 2013 when called upon by one of the members of JPC Yashwant Sinha for his alleged involvement in the 2G case.

Post-premiership (2014–present) 
Singh's premiership officially ended at noon on 17 May 2014. He did not contest the 2014 general election for the 16th Lok Sabha. Singh resigned his post as prime minister, after the Bharatiya Janata Party led National Democratic Alliance won the 2014 Lok Sabha election. He served as the acting prime minister till 25 May 2014, when Narendra Modi was sworn in as the new prime minister. Singh along with Congress president Sonia Gandhi, former Presidents A. P. J. Abdul Kalam and Pratibha Patil, Vice President Hamid Ansari attended Narendra Modi's swearing-in ceremony. After the swearing-in ceremony Singh shifted to 3 Motilal Nehru Road, New Delhi. In 2016 it was announced that Singh was to take up a position at Panjab University as the Jawaharlal Nehru Chair, which he eventually never did.

Public image 

The Independent described Singh as "one of the world's most revered leaders" and "a man of uncommon decency and grace", noting that he drives a Maruti 800, one of the humblest cars in the Indian market. Khushwant Singh lauded Singh as the best prime minister India has had, even rating him higher than Jawaharlal Nehru. He mentions an incident in his book Absolute Khushwant: The Low-Down on Life, Death and Most things In-between where after losing the 1999 Lok Sabha elections, Singh immediately returned the  he had borrowed from the writer for hiring taxis. Terming him as the best example of integrity, Khushwant Singh stated, "When people talk of integrity, I say the best example is the man who occupies the country's highest office."

In 2010, Newsweek magazine recognised him as a world leader who is respected by other heads of state, describing him as "the leader other leaders love." The article quoted Mohamed ElBaradei, who remarked that Singh is "the model of what a political leader should be." Singh also received the World Statesman Award in 2010. Henry Kissinger described Singh as "a statesman with vision, persistence and integrity", and praised him for his "leadership, which has been instrumental in the economic transformation underway in India."

Manmohan Singh was ranked 18 on the 2010 Forbes list of the World's Most Powerful People. Forbes magazine described Singh as being "universally praised as India's best prime minister since Nehru". Australian journalist Greg Sheridan praised Singh "as one of the greatest statesmen in Asian history." Singh was later ranked 19 and 28 in 2012 and 2013 in the Forbes list.

Conversely, Time magazine's Asia edition for 10–17 July 2012, on its cover remarked that Singh was an "underachiever". It stated that Singh appears "unwilling to stick his neck out" on reforms that will put the country back onto a growth path. Congress spokesperson Manish Tewari rebutted the charges. UPA ally Lalu Prasad Yadav took issue with the magazine's statements. Praising the government, Prasad said UPA projects [were] doing well and asked, "What will America say as their own economy is shattered?".

Political opponents, including BJP co-founder L. K. Advani, have claimed that Singh is a "weak" prime minister. Advani declared "He is weak. What do I call a person who can't take his decisions until 10 Janpath gives instruction." The Independent also claimed that Singh did not have genuine political power.

Singh's public image had been tarnished, with his coalition government having been accused of various corruption scandals since the start of its second term in 2009. The opposition demanded his resignation for his alleged inaction and indecisiveness in the 2G spectrum case and Indian coal allocation scam. Senior MP of the Communist Party of India Gurudas Dasgupta accused Manmohan Singh of "Dereliction of duty", alleging that Singh was fully aware of irregularities in dispensing of 2G telecom licences.

His party, the Indian National Congress, was criticised by the Supreme Court for appointing P.J. Thomas as the CVC chief, while there was an ongoing corruption enquiry against the same individual in the Palmolein Oil Import Scam. Singh has come in for severe criticism for remaining silent on the matter. Singh was also criticised for allowing allocation of S-band spectrum without any bidding to ISRO by an agreement. The agreement was between Devas multimedia, a private firm and Antrix Corporation, a commercial wing of ISRO.

Degrees and posts held 
 B.A (Honours) in Economics 1952; M.A (First Class) in Economics, 1954 Panjab University, Chandigarh (then in Hoshiarpur, Punjab), India
 Honours degree in Economics, University of Cambridge – St John's College (1957)
 Senior Lecturer, Economics (1957–1959)
 Reader (1959–1963)
 Professor (1963–1965)
 Professor of International Trade (1969–1971)
 DPhil in Economics, University of Oxford – Nuffield College (1962)
 Delhi School of Economics, University of Delhi
 Honorary Professor (1966)
 Chief, Financing for Trade Section, UNCTAD, United Nations Secretariat, New York
 1966 : Economic Affairs Officer 1966
 Economic Adviser, Ministry of Foreign Trade, India (1971–1972)
Chief Economic Adviser, Ministry of Finance, India, (1972–1976)
 Honorary Professor, Jawaharlal Nehru University, New Delhi (1976)
 Director, Reserve Bank of India (1976–1980)
 Director, Industrial Development Bank of India (1976–1980)
 Board of Governors, Asian Development Bank, Manila
Secretary, Ministry of Finance (Department of Economic Affairs), Government of India, (1977–1980)
 Governor, Reserve Bank of India (1982–1985)
 Deputy chairman, Planning Commission of India, (1985–1987)
 Secretary General, South Commission, Geneva (1987–1990)
 Advisor to Prime Minister of India on Economic Affairs (1990–1991)
 Chairman, University Grants Commission (15 March 1991 – 20 June 1991)
 Finance Minister of India, (21 June 1991 – 15 May 1996)
Member of Parliament in the Rajya Sabha (1 October 1991 – 14 June 2019)
 Leader of the Opposition (India) in the Rajya Sabha (1998–2004)
 Prime Minister of India (22 May 2004 – 26 May 2014)
Member of Parliament in the Rajya Sabha (19 August 2019 – Present)

Honours, awards and international recognition 

In March 1983, Panjab University awarded him Doctor of Letters and in 2009 created a Dr. Manmohan Singh chair in their economics department. In 1997, the University of Alberta awarded him an honorary Doctor of Law degree. The University of Oxford awarded him an honorary Doctor of Civil Law degree in July 2005, and in October 2006, the University of Cambridge followed with the same honour. St. John's College further honoured him by naming a PhD Scholarship after him, the Dr. Manmohan Singh Scholarship. In 2008, he was awarded honorary Doctor of Letters degree by Benaras Hindu University and later that year he was awarded an honorary doctorate degree by University of Madras. In 2010, he was awarded honorary doctorate degree by King Saud University and in 2013, he was awarded honorary doctorate degree by Moscow State Institute of International Relations. In 2017 awarded Indira Gandhi Prize for Peace, Disarmament and Development.

He has also received honorary doctorates from University of Bologna, University of Jammu and Indian Institute of Technology Roorkee.

State honours

In popular culture 

A Bollywood film was made in 2019 based on Singh's life,  titled The Accidental Prime Minister directed by Vijay Gutte and written by Mayank Tewari. The film was based on the 2014 memoir of the same name by Sanjaya Baru with Anupam Kher in the titular role.

Pradhanmantri, a 2013 Indian documentary television series which aired on ABP News and covers the various policies and political tenures of Indian PMs, includes the tenureship of Manmohan Singh in the episodes "Story of Sonia Gandhi and UPA-I Government", and "Scams in UPA government and anti-corruption movement".

See also 

 Dr Manmohan Singh Scholarship at the University of Cambridge
 Economic reforms under Manmohan Singh
 First Manmohan Singh ministry
 United Progressive Alliance

References

External links 

 Prime Minister Manmohan Singh Prime Ministers Office, Archived
 Profile and CV of Prime Minister Manmohan Singh Prime Ministers Office, Archived
 Cabinet of Prime Minister Manmohan Singh Prime Ministers Office, Archived
 

 
1932 births
Alumni of Nuffield College, Oxford
Alumni of St John's College, Cambridge
Fellows of St John's College, Cambridge
Fellows of Nuffield College, Oxford
Governors of the Reserve Bank of India
Indian civil servants
20th-century Indian economists
Trade economists
Indian National Congress politicians
Indian Sikhs
Living people
Members of the Planning Commission of India
Panjab University alumni
People from Chakwal District
People from Chandigarh
Punjab, India politicians
Academic staff of Panjab University
Academic staff of Delhi University
Leaders of the Opposition in the Rajya Sabha
21st-century Indian economists
Punjabi people
Punjabi politicians
Prime Ministers of India
Scientists from Punjab, India
People from Amritsar
Scholars from Punjab, India
Politicians from Amritsar
Chief Economic Advisers to the Government of India
Winners of the Nikkei Asia Prize
Ministers of Power of India
Culture Ministers of India
Ministers for External Affairs of India
Finance Ministers of India
Ministers for Corporate Affairs
Recipients of the Padma Vibhushan in civil service
Recipients of the Order of the Paulownia Flowers
21st-century prime ministers of India